The Chips is a passenger train that operates over the Blue Mountains between Lithgow and Sydney.

The name has been applied to various Blue Mountains services over the years and today is a commuter service from Lithgow to Sydney operated by V sets.

Following electrification of the Main Western line in 1958, it was operated by U set single-deck electric trains. These in turn were replaced by double-deck V sets.

It is complemented by another service, The Fish.

According to the current timetable, The Fish leaves Lithgow at 5:08am, reaches Mt Victoria at 5:37am and arrives Sydney at 7:47am. The Chips leaves Lithgow at 5:38am, reaches Mt Victoria at 6:07am and arrives Sydney at 8:17am.

References

Named passenger trains of New South Wales
Passenger rail transport in New South Wales